Rajadhiraja (Kannada: ರಾಜಾಧಿರಾಜ) is a 1992 Indian Kannada film, directed by H. R. Bhargava and produced by Sri Vaishnavi Internationals. The film stars Vishnuvardhan, Rupini, K. S. Ashwath and Shivaram in lead roles. The film had musical score by Vijayanand.

Cast

Vishnuvardhan
Rupini
K. S. Ashwath
Pandari Bai
Soundarya
Ramesh Bhat
Shivaram
Rajanand
Vajramuni
Mukhyamantri Chandru
Sudheer
Bhavyashree Rai
Shobha Raghavendra

Music
"Ninnalliro Anda" - S. P. Balasubrahmanyam, K. S. Chithra
"Daba Daba" - S. P. Balasubrahmanyam, K. S. Chithra
"Baa Priya Daamini" - S. P. Balasubrahmanyam
"Rajadhiraja" - S. P. Balasubrahmanyam
" Sambhanda Churaagi" - S. P. Balasubrahmanyam
"Yerida Gunginalli" - Manjula Gururaj

References

External links
 

1992 films
1990s Kannada-language films
Films directed by H. R. Bhargava
Films scored by Vijayanand